The Ermita de Nuestra Señora de Bienvenida is a hermitage located in Monteagudo de las Vicarías, Spain. It was declared Bien de Interés Cultural in 1983.

References 

Bien de Interés Cultural landmarks in the Province of Soria
Christian hermitages in Spain